Esetçe is a town (belde) in the İpsala District, Edirne Province, Turkey. Its population is 2,155 (2022). Esetçe was founded after the Russo-Turkish War (1877-1878) by Turks and Pomaks from Plevna (presently in Bulgaria) who escaped from the Russians.

References

Towns in Turkey
Populated places in İpsala District